Standish is an English surname. Notable people with the surname include:

Burt L. Standish, pen name of Gilbert Patten
Charity Standish, fictional character on NBC/DirecTV soap opera Passions
Charles Strickland Standish (1790–1863), British Whig politician
Dick Standish (born 1942), American journalist
E. Myles Standish (born 1939), mathematical astronomer
Frank Hall Standish (1799–1840), English collector of art and literature
Frederick Standish (1824–1883), Australian Chief Commissioner of Police in Victoria
Harold Standish (1919–1972), Canadian poet and novelist
Henry Standish (c. 1475–1535), English Franciscan
Hilda Crosby Standish (1902–2005), US physician and birth control advocate
Isolde Standish, Australian and British Humanities Scholar and film theorist
James D. Standish, communications director for the South Pacific Division of Seventh-day Adventists
John Standish, English Anglican priest
King Standish, fictional character in the DC Comics Universe
Michael Standish, British production designer
Michael "Miles" Standish (born 1964), American businessman, author, rare coin expert, sports memorabilia expert and philanthropist
Myles Standish (c. 1584–1656), one of the early Pilgrim settlers in America
Richard Standish (1621–1662), English politician and Civil War colonel
Robert Standish, pseudonym of the English novelist Digby George Gerahty
Robert Standish (artist) (born 1964), American artist
Russell K. Standish, Australian computational scientist
Standish brothers Colin and Russell, historic Seventh-day Adventists
Susanne Standish-White (born 1956), Zimbabwean rower
Thomas Standish (c. 1593–1642), English politician
William Lloyd Standish (1930–2015), United States District Judge

References